The following is a list of political parties registered at the Ministry of Interior, Spain, from 1976-2002.

Note that:

 The Ministry does not appear to remove registrations if parties become inactive or are dissolved, and many of the groups no longer exist.
 Some of the groups were actually electoral alliances formed to contest a specific election.
 Some of the groups are regional affiliates or branches of a national party.
 Some of the organizations are actually the youth wings of larger political parties.
 Parties are listed by Spanish name, English name, by city, and in chronological order.
Partido Social Regionalista (Unión Institucional) (Regionalist Social Party (Institutional Union), Ulldecona, 1976-10-04
Unió de Progrés Municipal, Tarragona, 1983-03-18
Unión de los Pueblos del Ebro, Tortosa, 1990-08-13
Forum Salou, Salou, 1990-12-14
Camp-Redo Poble, Tortosa, 1991-02-18
Plataforma Independent Municipal, Tortosa, 1991-03-07
Nuevo Salou, Salou, 1991-03-11
Unió Independents-Conca de Barbera, Rocafort de Queralt, 1991-03-15
Partit Independents Terres de l'Ebre, Sant Carles de la Rapita, 1991-03-26
Independent per Deltebre, Deltebre, 1991-04-03
Asociación Turística Pro-Salou, Salou, 1991-04-15
Asociación de Izquierda de Amposta, Amposta, 1994-01-18
Federació d'Independents de Catalunya, Reus, 1995-02-01
Partit Independents d'Amposta, Amposta, 1995-02-08
Unión Democrática Popular Española, Salou, 1995-03-24
Ferran Units per Salou, Salou, 1995-04-10
Unió per la Terra Alta, Batea, 1998-12-29

Tarragona
Political parties Tarragona